Anthony Tucker-Jones (born 1964) is a British former defence intelligence officer and a widely published military expert on regional conflicts, counter-terrorism and armoured and aerial warfare.

Tucker-Jones attended the University of Portsmouth (1982-1985) where he took a BA in Historical Studies before gaining an MA from Lancaster University (1987-1988) in International Relations and Strategic Studies. From 1981 to 1988 he was a freelance defence journalist writing for, among others, Jane's Defence Weekly, Jane's Intelligence Review and Middle East Strategic Studies Quarterly. Tucker-Jones then embarked on a thirteen year career in defence analysis during which period he was the UK Intelligence Liaison Officer United Nations Special Commission for Iraq (1994–1995) and Liaison Officer for NATO (1991–1994).

Tucker-Jones was the Counter-Terrorism Co-ordinator in charge of Defence Intelligence for the Ministry of Defence (2001–2002) since when he has been a freelance author, commentator and defence and military history author. He has been a commentator on current military issues, intelligence/terrorism and regional conflicts for such media as BBC Radio, Channel 4, ITN, Russia Today, Sky News and Voice of Russia. He has appeared on the History Channel and has acted as an expert witness for the Military Court Service.

Select publications
 Images of War: The Battle for Arnhem 
 1944-1945 (2019) 
 Images of War: The Battle for Warsaw 1939-1945, Pen and Sword (2020) 

Falaise: The Flawed Victory, Pen and Sword Books 
Operation Dragoon: The Liberation of Southern France 1944, Pen and Sword Books
Armoured Warfare on the Eastern Front, Pen and Sword Books
Tiger I & Tiger II, Pen and Sword Books
T-34: The Red Army's Legendary Medium Tank, Pen and Sword Books
The Panther Tank: Hitler’s T-34 Killer, Pen and Sword Books 
The Battle for Budapest 1944-1945, Pen and Sword Books 
The Panzer IV: Hitler’s Rock, Pen and Sword Books
The Rise of Militant Islam
Dien Bein Phu
Kursk 1943: Hitler's Bitter Harvest, History Press Limited, 2018 
Slaughter on the Eastern Front

References

External links
 

1964 births
Living people
Alumni of the University of Portsmouth
Alumni of Lancaster University
English military historians
Writers from Barnstaple